Eden Ben Basat (born 8 September 1986) was an Israeli professional footballer who played for the Israeli Premier League side Hapoel Haifa. At the international level, Ben Basat was capped from the under-17 level onward and is now a member of the Israeli national squad.

Early life
Ben Basat was born in Kiryat Haim, Israel, to a Jewish family.

He is the nephew of the legendary defender Eitan Aharoni, who also played for Maccabi Haifa and Hapoel Haifa.

Club career
Ben Basat grew up in the red side of Haifa, at Hapoel Haifa, but moved to the youth academy of Maccabi Haifa. In the U-16 team, he averaged more than 20 goals per season. Ben Basat played for every national team in Israel. Ronny Levy promoted him to the first team of Maccabi Haifa, and he made his first appearance on 19 December 2004 against Hapoel Nazareth Illit.

Ben Basat was the only Israeli selected to play an England Schools under-18 team with the Rest of the World Schools XI in a match to celebrate the 2004 centenary of the English Schools' Football Association. In this game he scored one of the goals.

At the end of the 2009–10 Israeli Premier League, Ben Basat negotiated the purchase of his player card with Maccabi Haifa. The negotiated fee settled upon was US$50,000.

Brest
At the end of the 2010–11 Israeli Premier League season, Ben Basat received a phone call to meet with Maccabi Haifa owner, Ya'akov Shahar. In that meeting, Shahar asked Ben Basat to return to Haifa in order to become a central part of the attack together with Tomer Hemed. Ben Basat politely declined and informed Shahar of his desire to try to play in Europe. In June 2011, Ben Basat announced that he had signed with French club, Stade Brestois 29. Ben Basat cited the club's seriousness in him as well as financial motivations for signing with the club.

Ahead of his move to France, Ben Basat acknowledged that it would be difficult. The language barrier as well as there being difficulties adhering to his kosher diet in France were some of the hardships he cited, but signing together with Colombian Jhon Culma meant that he would have someone who be understanding of his situation.

Toulouse
On 31 January 2013, Toulouse signed Ben Basat to a four-and-a-half-year deal from Brest for an undisclosed fee.

Maccabi Tel 
On 22 July 2014, Maccabi Tel Aviv signed Ben Basat to a four-year deal, for 700,000 €. On 20 October 2014, he scored his debut goal for his team at the 3–1 win against Maccabi Haifa.

Hapoel Haifa
On 14 January 2018, Eden Ben Basat scored the first goal of the match for Hapoel Haifa against league champions Hapoel Be'er Sheva F.C., after no more than seven seconds, breaking an all-time Israeli Premier League record.

International career
Ben Basat made his debut in the 2014 FIFA World Cup qualification campaign as a substitute against Russia in a 4–0 defeat, and scored his first goal against Luxembourg in his second appearance.

International goals
Scores and results list Israel's goal tally first, score column indicates score after each Ben Basat goal.

Honours
Maccabi Haifa
Israeli Championship: 2004–05, 2005–06

Maccabi Tel Aviv
Israeli Premier League: 2014–15
Israel State Cup: 2014-15 
Toto Cup: 2014–15

Hapoel Haifa
Israel State Cup: 2017-18

References

1986 births
Israeli Jews
Living people
Israeli footballers
Israeli expatriate footballers
Association football forwards
Maccabi Haifa F.C. players
Maccabi Herzliya F.C. players
Hapoel Haifa F.C. players
Hapoel Ironi Kiryat Shmona F.C. players
Hapoel Tel Aviv F.C. players
Stade Brestois 29 players
Hapoel Be'er Sheva F.C. players
Israeli Premier League players
Liga Leumit players
Ligue 1 players
Footballers from Haifa
Expatriate footballers in France
Israeli expatriate sportspeople in France